Bear Creek is a stream in the U.S. state of Iowa. It is a tributary to the Des Moines River.

Bear Creek was named from a pioneer incident when hunter killed a bear near its course.

References

Rivers of Iowa
Rivers of Boone County, Iowa